Charax is a genus containing several species of South American tetras, including the glass headstander, C. gibbosus. These fish, among other characteristics, are small and have a rhomboid shape. Some species are semi-translucent.

Species
There are currently 16 recognized species in this genus:
 Charax apurensis C. A. S. de Lucena, 1987
 Charax caudimaculatus C. A. S. de Lucena, 1987
 Charax condei Géry & Knöppel, 1976
 Charax delimai Menezes & C. A. S. de Lucena, 2014 
 Charax gibbosus Linnaeus, 1758 (Glass headstander)
 Charax hemigrammus C. H. Eigenmann, 1912
 Charax leticiae C. A. S. de Lucena, 1987
 Charax macrolepis Kner, 1858
 Charax metae C. H. Eigenmann, 1922
 Charax michaeli C. A. S. de Lucena, 1989
 Charax niger C. A. S. de Lucena, 1989
 Charax notulatus C. A. S. de Lucena, 1987
 Charax pauciradiatus Günther, 1864
 Charax rupununi C. H. Eigenmann, 1912
 Charax stenopterus Cope, 1894
 Charax tectifer Cope, 1870

References

Characidae